The 2017 Tennessee Titans season was the franchise's 48th season in the National Football League and the 58th overall. It also marked the franchise's 21st season in the state of Tennessee as well as the second full season under head coach Mike Mularkey. They equaled their record from a year ago, and not only that, with a 15–10 win over the Jacksonville Jaguars in Week 17, they clinched their first playoff berth since 2008. In the first round, the Titans rallied from a 21–3 halftime deficit against the Chiefs to win 22–21, winning their first playoff game since 2003. However, they were defeated by the New England Patriots in the Divisional Round by the score of 35–14. Despite making the playoffs and winning a playoff game, this would be Mularkey's final year coaching the Titans, as they parted ways after the season ended. This is also the last season where the Titans wore their uniform design since 1999.

Offseason

Organizational changes
On January 4, the Titans fired wide receivers coach Bob Bratkowski and assistant wide receivers coach Jason Tucker. On January 5, general manager Jon Robinson was promoted to executive vice president/general manager.

Roster changes

Reserve/future free agent contracts

The first transactions of the year occurred shortly after the conclusion of the 2016 regular season on January 3, 2017, when the Titans signed offensive lineman Karim Barton, linebacker Kourtnei Brown, tight end Jerome Cunningham, running back David Fluellen, wide receiver Jonathan Krause, offensive tackle Tyler Marz, and wide receiver K.J. Maye to reserve/future contracts.

On January 4, the Titans signed linebacker Reshard Cliett and tight end Tim Semisch to reserve/future contracts.

The Titans signed their final two futures contracts of 2017, in defensive back Tye Smith on January 16 and defensive tackle Caushaud Lyons on January 24.

Free agents

Departures

2017 NFL draft

Notes
 The 2017 NFL Draft marked the first year that compensatory picks could be traded.

Undrafted free agents

Source:

Minicamp tryouts

Source:

Staff

Final roster

Team captains
Marcus Mariota (QB) 
Delanie Walker (TE)
Jurrell Casey (DE)
Brian Orakpo (LB)
Wesley Woodyard (LB)
Tim Shaw (Honorary, former Titans LB)

Preseason

Regular season

Schedule

Note: Intra-division opponents are in bold text.

Game summaries

Week 1: vs. Oakland Raiders

Week 2: at Jacksonville Jaguars

Week 3: vs. Seattle Seahawks

Week 4: at Houston Texans

Week 5: at Miami Dolphins

Phillip Supernaw caught his first career touchdown.

Week 6: vs. Indianapolis Colts

Rookie Taywan Taylor caught his first career touchdown.

Week 7: at Cleveland Browns

Week 9: vs. Baltimore Ravens

Week 10: vs. Cincinnati Bengals

Week 11: at Pittsburgh Steelers

Week 12: at Indianapolis Colts

This was the Titans' first win in Indianapolis since 2007, and their first season sweep of Indy since 2002.

Week 13: vs. Houston Texans

Week 14: at Arizona Cardinals

Week 15: at San Francisco 49ers

Week 16: vs. Los Angeles Rams

Week 17: vs. Jacksonville Jaguars

With the win, the Titans clinched their first playoff berth since 2008.

Standings

Division

Conference

Postseason

Game summaries

AFC Wild Card Playoffs: at (4) Kansas City Chiefs

Marcus Mariota became the first quarterback in NFL playoff history to throw a touchdown to himself. In addition, the Titans won their first playoff game since 2003.

AFC Divisional Playoffs: at (1) New England Patriots

Rookie Corey Davis caught his first career touchdowns. These would not be enough, however, as the top-seeded/defending champion Patriots steamrolled the Titans, 35-14. With the loss, the Titans' season ended, with a record of 10-8. With the Patriots losing to the Eagles three weeks later in Super Bowl LII, the Titans would have the third-longest championship drought of any team in the NFL, going back to 1961 when they were the Houston Oilers.

References

External links
 

Tennessee
Tennessee Titans seasons
Tennessee Titans